Suzanne Jane Wilkinson is a New Zealand engineering academic. She is currently a full professor at Massey University.

Academic career

Suzanne is a full Professor in the School of Built Environment at Massey University in Auckland. Suzanne has PhD in Construction Management, and a BEng (Hons) in Civil Engineering, both from Oxford Brookes University, UK. She also has a Graduate Diploma in Business Studies (Dispute Resolution) from Massey University. Her current research focuses on disaster management, construction innovation, resilience and smart cities. She is interested in how cities, communities and organisations, including construction organisations, plan for disasters and manage hazard events and how to make them more resilience. At the moment she is working on ideas on construction climate mitigation. After a 1993 PhD titled  'Entry to Employment : Choices made by qualified women civil engineers leaving higher education'  at the Oxford Brookes University, she moved to the University of Auckland, rising to full Professor in 2016 before moving to her new position as Director of postgraduate studies in the School of Built Environment and Associate Dean (Research) in the College of Sciences at Massey University..

Selected works 
Suzanne has written and co-authored over 300 publications, many in top international journals.
She is considered one of the world experts in disaster management, disaster recovery and post-disaster reconstruction.

 Chang, Yan, Suzanne Wilkinson, Regan Potangaroa, and Erica Seville. "Resourcing challenges for post-disaster housing reconstruction: a comparative analysis." Building Research & Information 38, no. 3 (2010): 247–264.
 Chang, Yan, Suzanne Wilkinson, Regan Potangaroa, and Erica Seville. "Donor-driven resource procurement for post-disaster reconstruction: Constraints and actions." Habitat International 35, no. 2 (2011): 199–205.
 Chang, Yan, Suzanne Wilkinson, Erica Seville, and Regan Potangaroa. "Resourcing for a resilient post-disaster reconstruction environment." International Journal of Disaster Resilience in the Built Environment 1, no. 1 (2010): 65–83.
 Seville, Erica, David Brunsdon, Andre Dantas, Jason Le Masurier, Suzanne Wilkinson, and John Vargo. "Organisational resilience: Researching the reality of New Zealand organisations." Journal of business continuity & emergency planning 2, no. 3 (2008): 258–266.

Books
 Mannakkara S., Wilkinson S., Potangaroa R., (2018) Resilient Post Disaster Recovery through Building Back Better, Routledge, 148 pages.
 Wilkinson, S., Scofield, R. (2010). Management for the New Zealand Construction Industry (2nd ed.). New Zealand: Pearson Education New Zealand, 306 pages. 
 Brooker, P., Wilkinson, S. (2010). Mediation in the Construction Industry: an international review. UK: Routledge, Taylor and Francis, 224 pages.
 Wilkinson, S., Scofield, R, (2003). Management for the New Zealand Construction Industry, Prentice Hall, Auckland, New Zealand, 306 pages,

References

External links
  
 

Living people
Academic staff of the Massey University
New Zealand women academics
Alumni of Oxford Brookes University
Academic staff of the University of Auckland
New Zealand engineers
Year of birth missing (living people)